Richard Fletcher (January 8, 1788 – June 21, 1869) was a member of the United States House of Representatives from Massachusetts.  The brother of Governor Ryland Fletcher, he was born in Cavendish, Vermont on January 8, 1788.  He pursued classical studies and graduated from Dartmouth College in 1806.  He taught school in Salisbury, New Hampshire, studied law, was admitted to the bar and commenced practice there.

He moved to Boston in 1819 and was elected as a Whig to the Twenty-fifth Congress (March 4, 1837 – March 3, 1839).  Fletcher was not a candidate for renomination  to the Twenty-sixth Congress. He served as a judge of the Massachusetts Supreme Court 1848–1853, and died in Boston on June 21, 1869.  His interment was in Mount Auburn Cemetery in Cambridge.

Fletcher was elected as the first president of the American Statistical Association, although by the ASA's own admission, he was "little more than a figurehead".

See also
 List of presidents of the American Statistical Association

Sources
 

Dartmouth College alumni
1788 births
1869 deaths
Justices of the Massachusetts Supreme Judicial Court
Burials at Mount Auburn Cemetery
Presidents of the American Statistical Association
Whig Party members of the United States House of Representatives from Massachusetts
19th-century American politicians
19th-century American judges